Fleurus was a late 100-gun Hercule-class ship of the line of the French Navy, transformed into a sail and steam ship.

Service history
Ordered in 1825 as Brianée and soon renamed Dauphin Royal, Fleurus was laid down in 1825 but not completed before 1855. She took her definitive name after the July Revolution, on 9 August 1830.

From January 1855, she conducted her engine trials. She proceeded to the Black Sea to take part in the Crimean War. In 1862, she served as a troopship for the French intervention in Mexico.

She finished her career as a hulk in Saigon, headquarters to the French naval division of Indochina.

Notes, citations, and references

Notes

Citations

References

 100-guns ships of the line

Ships of the line of the French Navy
1853 ships
Hercule-class ships of the line
Victorian-era ships of the line